Grant Alan Show (born February 27, 1962) is an American actor best known for his role on Melrose Place as Jake Hanson, which he played from 1992 to 1997. Since 2017, Show has portrayed tycoon Blake Carrington in the soap opera reboot Dynasty.

Early life
Show was born in Detroit, Michigan, to Ed and Kathleen Show (née McMillion), and has a sister, Kelly, with whom he was raised in the Milpitas, California, area. He is a graduate of UCLA, where he was a member of the Alpha Tau Omega fraternity.

Career

He broke into show business during college. His first major role was on the daytime soap opera Ryan's Hope, in which he played Rick Hyde from 1984–1987. During his last year on the show, he received a Daytime Emmy nomination for "Outstanding Young Actor in a Daytime Drama Series". Also during his time on the soap, Show dated fellow Ryan's Hope actor Yasmine Bleeth. Hyped as the series' leading heart-throb, he even had a pin-up poster issued during the series' run but later became dissatisfied with acting in soaps and went to London in order to improve his craft. Returning to the US in the late 1980s, he landed occasional primetime television acting jobs.

His appearances on television attracted the attention of producer Aaron Spelling, who felt he had star potential and decided to cast him as Jake Hanson on a few episodes of the popular series Beverly Hills, 90210 in order to spin off the character as the lead in his next series Melrose Place. Debuting with much fanfare (Show was on the covers of both TV Guide and People immediately after the series' debut), the series' ratings in its first season were not up to expectations, and the show was revamped in the middle of the first season from an episodic strait-laced drama format to a melodramatic soap opera serial format in the tradition of Dynasty, one of Spelling's earlier hits. The series made Show one of the most popular and best-known actors on American television during the 1990s. He also played Jake in a guest appearance in the pilot of the Melrose spin-off Models Inc., making him the only actor to play the same character on the first three shows in the Beverly Hills, 90210 franchise.

During his time on Melrose Place, Show also appeared on an episode of Saturday Night Live hosted by Laura Leighton. In 1997, Show, Laura Leighton (an off-screen girlfriend of Show's for a period), Doug Savant, Courtney Thorne-Smith and Marcia Cross left Melrose Place, which led the show into a major decline. It was cancelled two years later, though Show later regretted his decision to leave, despite his dislike of the scripts during his final season.

He has since starred in a number of television movies, including Blessed Assurance with Cicely Tyson, Between Love and Honor with Robert Loggia, and Homeland Security with Tom Skerritt and was one of the leads in the short-lived Fox Network supernatural drama Point Pleasant in 2005. He made a guest appearance for three episodes in HBO's acclaimed series Six Feet Under in 2002, and in 2006 he guest-starred on two episodes of the ABC Family show Beautiful People, alongside former Melrose Place co-star Daphne Zuniga.

In 2007, Show appeared in three episodes of the FX show Dirt, playing a closeted gay action movie hero, Jack Dawson. In 2008, Show starred in the short-lived CBS summer drama series Swingtown as an airline pilot, Tom Decker. Show was also featured in a recurring role in episodes of Private Practice in the 2008–2009 season. He recently starred opposite Jenna Elfman in Accidentally on Purpose, his first sitcom. In the 2010–2011 season, he appeared in the recurrent role of Michael Sainte, the Goji Guru, on the HBO series Big Love. He has acted in a number of stage productions. In 1990, he played the lead in an adaptation of On the Waterfront and after his stint on Melrose Place he appeared in a production of The Glass Menagerie. He was on Broadway in 1999 playing a doctor in Wit. In 2012, he appeared in the film The Possession, directed by Ole Bornedal, alongside Jeffrey Dean Morgan and Kyra Sedgwick. In 2013, he began his role as Spence Westmore on Devious Maids. In March 2017, he was cast in The CW's Dynasty reboot as Blake Carrington.

Personal life
Grant Show married model and actress Pollyanna McIntosh in 2004. The couple met when they posed together for a Lane Bryant ad in 2003. They were divorced in 2011. In July 2012, Show became engaged to actress Katherine LaNasa. They married on August 18, 2012. They had a daughter, Eloise McCue Show, on March 25, 2014.

Filmography

Film

Television

References

External links

1962 births
20th-century American male actors
21st-century American male actors
Living people
Male actors from California
American male film actors
American male soap opera actors
American male stage actors
American male television actors
Male actors from Detroit
People from Milpitas, California
University of California, Los Angeles alumni
Barber Pro Series drivers